Vespertine is a term used in the life sciences to indicate something of, relating to, or occurring in the evening. In botany, a vespertine flower is one that opens or blooms in the evening. In zoology, the term is used for a creature that becomes active at dusk, such as bats and owls. Strictly speaking, however, the term means that activity ceases during the hours of full darkness and does not resume until the next evening. Activity that continues throughout the night should be described as nocturnal. 

Vespertine behaviour is a special case of crepuscular behaviour; like crepuscular activity, vespertine activity is limited to dusk rather than full darkness. Unlike vespertine activity, crepuscular activity may resume in dim twilight before dawn. A related term is matutinal, referring to activity limited to the dawn twilight.

The word vespertine is derived from the Latin word , meaning "evening".

See also
 Crypsis
 Matutinal

References

Ethology
Botany